The 2022 Sun Belt Conference football season is the 22nd season of college football play for the Sun Belt Conference (SBC). The season began on September 2, 2022, and will conclude with its conference championship game on December 3, 2022. It is part of the 2022 NCAA Division I FBS football season. The conference expanded to 14 football members for the 2022 season with the addition of 4 new member schools. The 14 members were divided into two divisions for play. The conference released its schedule on March 1, 2022.

Previous season

The 2021 season saw Appalachian State win the East Division, while Louisiana won the West Division. In the Conference Championship game, Louisiana took victory by a score of 24–16. Louisiana advanced to the New Orleans Bowl, where they defeated Marshall. Appalachian State advanced to the Boca Raton Bowl, where they lost to Western Kentucky.

Coastal Carolina and Georgia State also reached bowl games, with both winning their games.

Conference expansion
Prior to the 2022 season, the SBC added four new schools as full members: Marshall, Old Dominion, and Southern Miss, previously from Conference USA, and James Madison, previously from the Colonial Athletic Association at the Division I FCS level. The initial intent was for the schools to begin playing in the conference starting no later that July 1, 2023. However, all four teams elected to join for the 2022 season, with the move officially announced with the release of the conference's 2022 schedule.

For the 2022 season, James Madison is ineligible for both the conference championship and for bowl games due to its transition from the FCS level to FBS level. Due to JMU meeting FBS scheduling requirements for the 2022 season, specifically five home games against FBS opponents, it was able to skip one year of the normal two-year transition process, making it eligible for both the SBC title and bowl games beginning with the 2023 season.

Preseason

Preseason Media Poll
The Sun Belt released its preseason poll on July 25. Appalachian State was named the favorite to win the East Division, while Louisiana was named the favorite to win the West Division.

Preseason All-Conference teams
Offensive Player of the Year: Grayson McCall (Redshirt Junior, Coastal Carolina quarterback)
Defensive Player of the Year: Josaiah Stewart, (Sophomore, Coastal Carolina defensive lineman)

Individual awards
The following list contains Sun Belt players who were included on preseason watch lists for national awards.

Head coaches
On September 26, 2021, Georgia Southern fired head coach Chad Lunsford after 5 seasons with the team. Former USC head coach Clay Helton was announced as his permanent replacement, with Helton taking over duties at the conclusion of the 2021 season.
On November 21, 2021, Troy fired head coach Chip Lindsey after 4 seasons with the team. Troy hired Kentucky co-defensive coordinator Jon Sumrall as his replacement.
On November 28, 2021, Louisiana head coach Billy Napier announced that he was leaving the team to take the head coach position at Florida in the Southeastern Conference. Louisiana promoted their co-offensive coordinator Michael Desormeaux to replace Napier.

Post-season changes
On November 27, Texas State announced that they had fired head coach Jake Spavital. Spavital had posted a record of 13–35 over four years at the school. On December 7, Texas State announced Incarnate Word's head coach G. J. Kinne would take over as the new head coach for the 2023 season.
On December 4, Jamey Chadwell announced that he was leaving Coastal Carolina to take over the head coaching position at Liberty. Coastal Carolina's defensive coordinator Chad Staggs took over as the interim head coach for the team's bowl game. Later on December 4, Coastal Carolina announced NC State offensive coordinator Tim Beck as the new head coach beginning in 2023.

Rankings

Schedule

All times Central time.

Week 1

Week 2

Week 3

Week 4

Week 5

Week 6

Week 7

Week 8

Week 9

Week 10

Week 11

Week 12

Week 13

Championship Game

Week 15 (Sun Belt Championship Game)

Postseason

Bowl Games

Rankings are from Final CFP rankings. All times Central Time Zone.

Selection of teams
Bowl eligible (7): Coastal Carolina, Georgia Southern, Louisiana, Marshall, South Alabama, Southern Miss, Troy 
Bowl ineligible (7): Appalachian State, Arkansas State, Georgia State, James Madison, Louisiana–Monroe, Old Dominion, Texas State

Sun Belt Records against other conferences
2022–2023 records against non-conference foes:

Regular Season

Postseason

Sun Belt vs Power 5 matchups
This is a list of games the Sun Belt has scheduled versus power conference teams (ACC, Big 10, Big 12, Pac-12, BYU, Notre Dame and SEC). All rankings are from the current AP Poll at the time of the game.

Sun Belt vs Group of Five matchups
The following games include Sun Belt teams competing against teams from the American, C-USA, MAC, or Mountain West.

Sun Belt vs FBS independents matchups
The following games include Sun Belt teams competing against FBS Independents, which includes Army, Liberty, New Mexico State, UConn, or UMass.

Sun Belt vs FCS matchups
The following games include Sun Belt teams competing against FCS schools.

Home game attendance

Bold – At or Exceeded capacity
†Season High

Awards and honors

Player of the week honors

Sun Belt Individual Awards
The following individuals received postseason honors as voted by the Sun Belt Conference football coaches at the end of the season.

All-Conference Teams
The following players were selected as part of the Sun Belt's All-Conference Teams.

Notes

References